Brooklyn is a settlement in Newfoundland and Labrador.

References

Populated places in Newfoundland and Labrador